Braeden Ogle (born July 30, 1997) is an American professional baseball pitcher who is a free agent.

Amateur career
Ogle attended Jensen Beach High School in Jensen Beach, Florida. As a senior in 2016, he went 5–1 with a 1.40 ERA and 59 strikeouts over 35 innings. He was selected by the Pittsburgh Pirates in the fourth round with the 135th overall selection of the 2016 Major League Baseball draft. He signed for $800,000, forgoing his college commitment to the University of Florida.

Professional career
Ogle made his professional debut with the Rookie-level Gulf Coast League Pirates, going 0–2 with a 2.60 ERA over  innings. In 2017, he played with the Bristol Pirates of the Rookie-level Appalachian League in which he pitched to a 2–3 record and a 3.14 ERA over 43 innings before undergoing knee surgery, ending his season prematurely. He began 2018 with the West Virginia Power of the Class A South Atlantic League, but pitched only 17 innings before being shut down in early May for the rest of the season due to shoulder inflammation. In 2019, he began the season with the Greensboro Grasshoppers of the Class A South Atlantic League and was promoted to the Bradenton Marauders of the Class A-Advanced Florida State League in June. Over 43 innings between the two clubs, he went 3–3 with a 3.56 ERA and 44 strikeouts. To begin the 2021 season, Ogle was assigned to the Indianapolis Indians of the Triple-A East. Over  innings with the Indians, Ogle went 2–2 with a 3.13 ERA, 42 strikeouts, and 23 walks.

On July 30, 2021, Ogle was traded to the Philadelphia Phillies in exchange for Abrahán Gutiérrez. He was assigned to the Lehigh Valley IronPigs of the Triple-A East. Over twenty relief appearances with the IronPigs, Ogle went 1–3 with a 9.95 ERA, 14 walks, and 18 strikeouts over 19 innings. He returned to Lehigh Valley for the 2022 season. Over 36 relief appearances, he went 2–2 with a 5.30 ERA, 24 strikeouts, and 21 walks over  innings.

On November 10, 2022, Ogle elected free agency.

References

External links

Minor league baseball players
1997 births
Living people
Baseball pitchers
Baseball players from Florida
Gulf Coast Pirates players
Bristol Pirates players
West Virginia Power players
Greensboro Grasshoppers players
Bradenton Marauders players
Indianapolis Indians players
Lehigh Valley IronPigs players